Sakuta Takefushi (17 April 1906 – 12 August 1988) was a Japanese cross-country skier. He competed in the men's 18 kilometre event at the 1928 Winter Olympics.

References

1906 births
1988 deaths
Japanese male cross-country skiers
Japanese male Nordic combined skiers
Olympic cross-country skiers of Japan
Olympic Nordic combined skiers of Japan
Cross-country skiers at the 1928 Winter Olympics
Nordic combined skiers at the 1928 Winter Olympics
Sportspeople from Nagano Prefecture
20th-century Japanese people